Your Average Australian Yobbo was the debut album by Australian singer/comedian Kevin Bloody Wilson. It started out as just a collection of  rude songs on a tape which he sold at performances at pubs and clubs around Australia, and by mail order. 22,000 copies of the cassette, Your Average Australian Yobbo, were sold this way. The album was later transferred to vinyl in 1986 and then re-released on CD in April, 2002.

Track listing
All tracks written by Denis Bryant.

 "Sunday Morning" - 3:42
 "I Gave Up Wanking" - 4:01
 "Cum Chin Mi Gurflen" - 1:39
 "Arr Fuck" (The Instrumental) - 1:59
 "Country Bumpkin" - 3:48
 "That Fucking Cat's Back" - 2:55
 "Stack the Fridge" - 2:31
 "Ailments of the Eighties" - 2:16
 "Wow, Did I Get Whacked!" - 5:48
 "The Festival of Life" - 5:41

Charts

References

1984 debut albums
Kevin Bloody Wilson albums
1980s comedy albums